Roscoe Harold Hansen Jr. (born September 24, 1929) is a former American football tackle who played for the Philadelphia Eagles. He played college football at the University of North Carolina at Chapel Hill, having previously attended Holy Spirit High School in New Jersey.

References

1929 births
Living people
American football tackles
North Carolina Tar Heels football players
Philadelphia Eagles players
Players of American football from New York City